The Cheyenne are a Native American people, whose native language is the Cheyenne language.

Cheyenne may also refer to:

Places in the United States

 Cheyenne, Oklahoma, a town
 Cheyenne, Wyoming, the state capital of Wyoming
 Cheyenne Creek, Colorado
 Cheyenne Creek (South Dakota)
 Cheyenne River, in Wyoming and South Dakota

People
 Cheyenne (given name)

Arts, entertainment, and media

Films
 Cheyenne (1929 film), a silent Western starring Ken Maynard
 Cheyenne (1947 film), a Western starring Dennis Morgan and Jane Wyman

Games
 Cheyenne (board game), a Milton Bradley game based on the television show
 Cheyenne (video game), a 1984 Western arcade shooting video game
 Cheyenne Indians (baseball), a baseball team

Music
 "Cheyenne" (1906 song), a Western song
 "Cheyenne" (Jason Derulo song), 2015
 "Cheyenne" (Francesca Michielin song), 2019

Other arts, entertainment, and media
 Cheyenne (TV series), a Western TV show
 Cheyenne Enterprises, an American television and film production company partially owned by Bruce Willis
 Cheyenne, Nebraska, a fictional location in the AMC-TV television series Hell on Wheels, the town formerly called "Durant, Nebraska"

Military
 Lockheed AH-56 Cheyenne, a military attack helicopter
 , six vessels
 , U.S. Coast Guard river buoy tender

Transportation
 , a large catamaran captained by Steve Fossett that set a transatlantic record
 Chevrolet Cheyenne (concept car), introduced in 2003
 Chevrolet Silverado, a series of pickup trucks marketed in Mexico as the Chevrolet Cheyenne
 Cheyenne Transit, serving Laramie County, Wyoming
 Piper PA-31T Cheyenne, a turboprop aircraft
 Piper PA-42 Cheyenne, a turboprop aircraft
 , see Boats of the Mackenzie River watershed

Other uses
 Cheyenne (supercomputer), located in Cheyenne, Wyoming
 Cheyenne Software, American software company now trading as Arcserve
 Disney's Hotel Cheyenne, Disneyland Paris

See also

 
 
 Cayenne (disambiguation)
 Chayanne (disambiguation)
 Sheyenne (disambiguation)